A module in Dungeons & Dragons is an adventure published by TSR. The term is usually applied to adventures published for all Dungeons & Dragons games before 3rd Edition. For 3rd Edition and beyond new publisher Wizards of the Coast uses the term adventure. For a list of published 3rd, 4th, and 5th Edition Adventures see List of Dungeons & Dragons adventures. For description and history of Adventures/Modules see Adventure (D&D). Adventures for various campaign settings are listed in different articles, including Forgotten Realms, Dragonlance, Greyhawk, Mystara, Kara-Tur, Spelljammer, Ravenloft, Al-Qadim, Dark Sun, Planescape, Birthright, and Eberron.

The modules listed here are in three separate lists of official TSR Dungeons & Dragons modules only.
The coded modules (1992–1995) are listed by module code.
Modules made after the code system was dropped (1993–2000) are displayed in alphabetical order.
Note: There is considerable overlap caused by the transition period and early pre-advertising for some modules.

Coded modules (1978–1994)
Module codes in brackets indicate implied codes either by earlier advertising or place in a series; some of these modules did not actually have codes printed on the cover.

A
A—Aerie of the Slave Lords is a linked campaign of four AD&D (1st Ed.) modules created for Gen Con XIII and set in Greyhawk. They can also form an extended campaign following T and followed by G.

AC—ACcessory Modules is a series of accessory items for D&D (Basic/Expert/Companion/Master), many of which included mini-adventures. They are generally associated with Mystara albeit quite generic.

B
B—Basic were designed for use with the Dungeons & Dragons Basic set. Mostly they are independent adventures, set in Mystara.

C
C—Competition modules for AD&D (1st) are specially designed for competition play and come with a scoring system for player actions.

CA—City of Adventure for AD&D (1st) require the Lankhmar: City of Adventure supplement to play.

CB—Conan the Barbarian modules for AD&D (1st) tie in with the Conan movies.

CM—CoMpanion is for use with Dungeons & Dragons Companion Set (or Rules Cyclopedia), and were set in Mystara.

D
D—Drow is a linked campaign of AD&D (1st Ed) modules created for Gen Con XI set in Greyhawk. They can also form an extended campaign following G, and followed by Q.

DA—Dave Arneson is set in Blackmoor for Expert Set

DDA—Dungeons & Dragons Adventure for Basic Set, set in Mystara.

DL—Dragonlance introduced the Dragonlance campaign. They are linked series traditional modules for AD&D (1st Ed) except where noted.

DLA—Dragonlance Adventure trilogy of linked adventures are set on the lost continent of Taladas in the Dragonlance world, for 2nd Edition AD&D.

DLC—Dragonlance Classics collects the original Dragonlance modules, revised for 2nd Edition AD&D.

DL(E/Q/S/T)—Dragonlance (Epic/Quest/Saga/Tales) for 2nd Edition AD&D.

DQ—DragonQuest is compatible with both AD&D (1st Edition) or DragonQuest RPG

DS(Q/E)—Dark Sun (Quest/Epic) is a set of linked modules that require Dark Sun campaign setting.

DSM—Dark Sun Mission is a set of linked modules that require the Dark Sun campaign setting.

E
EX—EXtension Series are AD&D modules designed as a "tack-on" adventure set in Greyhawk.

G
G—Giants is a linked campaign of AD&D (1st Ed) module(s) created for Origins '78 set in Greyhawk. They can also form an extended campaign following A, and followed by D.

GA—General Adventure for 2nd Edition AD&D, not specific to any campaign setting.

GAZ—GAZetteer The GAZ series described countries in the Known World of Mystara, using the D&D Basic and Expert Set rules, although beginning with GAZ07, rules for adapting to AD&D are provided. However the 15th product in this Mystara Gazetteer series, Dawn of the Emperors: Thyatis and Alphatia, was instead sold as a boxed set without an official GAZ-module code.

H
H—The Bloodstone Pass Saga is a linked campaign series that focuses on using Battlesystem battles in Forgotten Realms AD&D adventures.

HHQ—Head to Head Quest modules for 2nd Edition AD&D are designed for one Player and a DM

HW—Hollow World set in Mystara.

I
I—Intermediate, for AD&D, mostly separate adventures though some sequels do exist within the series.

IM—Immortal, for use with D&D Immortals Set. Set in Mystara.

L
L—Lendore Isles was Lenard Lakofka's campaign that was made part of Greyhawk. It was originally planned to be a series of five linked modules, but only three were ever published.

LN(A/Q/R)—Lankhmar/Nehwon (Adventure/Quest/Reference) independent adventures for use with Lankhmar City of Adventure box set.

M
M—Master for use with the Master Dungeons & Dragons rules, set in Mystara.

MSOLO: solo modules set in Mystara by default.

MV—Magic Viewer: solo adventure for 1st Edition AD&D.

N
N—Novice

O
O—One on one (one player one master) set in Mystara.

OA—Oriental Adventures was originally its own campaign setting (see Oriental Adventures and List of Forgotten Realms modules and sourcebooks), but from OA5 was incorporated into Forgotten Realms.

OP—Outer Planes for use with the AD&D Manual of the Planes.

Q
Q—Queen of the Demonweb Pits single module conclusion to the G and D series

R
R—Role Playing Game Association tournament modules, R1–6 were also available to RPGA members. R1–4 were later revised and abridged as I12.  Mentzer initially intended the "R" series to take place in Greyhawk (on a different continent from Oerik) as part of an "Acquaria" or "Aqua-Oeridian" campaign.  The original concept was to use these modules to form the basis of a new Greyhawk boxed set, although TSR never went forward with these plans and as such the modules are not officially for Greyhawk.

RA—Ravenloft / RQ—Ravenloft Quests TSR changed coding for sales purposes. Grand Conjunction Campaign was developed after the first 3 modules were made

RM—Ravenloft Missions TSR changed coding again for sales purposes 

RPGA—Role Playing Game Association tournament modules, also available to RPGA members. This series was later revised and reprinted as B7, C4 & C5.

RS—Red Sonja

S
S—Special

SJA—Spelljammer Adventure set in the Spelljammer campaign setting

SJQ–Spelljammer Quest set in the Spelljammer campaign setting

SJS—Spelljammer Sourcebook set in the Spelljammer campaign setting

ST–Steam Train (or Stoke-on-Trent) limited edition module released at 1986 Stoke-on-Trent Garden Festival (UK).

T
T—Temple of Elemental Evil set in Greyhawk.

U
U—Underwater a linked trilogy set in Greyhawk, published in the UK.

UK—United Kingdom a series of mostly independent adventures developed by the TSR UK office

W
WG—World of Greyhawk was a series of stand-alone adventures set in Greyhawk for 1st edition except as noted. No modules were ever assigned codes WG1–WG3. WG1 was earmarked for The Village of Hommlet (T1), and WG2 was earmarked for The Temple of Elemental Evil (T1-4). WG3 was to be Lost Caverns of Tsojcanth (S4), a loosely tied prequel to WG4. WG7 was advertised during summer 1986 as Shadowlords, a collaboration between Gary Gygax and Skip Williams.  Gygax's lawsuit with TSR put Shadowlords in limbo, and it was replaced with Castle Greyhawk.

WGA—World of Greyhawk Adventure 

WGM—World of Greyhawk Mission

WGQ—World of Greyhawk Quest

WGR—World of Greyhawk Reference is a mix of adventures and background information.

WGS—World of Greyhawk Swords was originally intended as a trilogy. The planned third module became instead the Greyhawk Wars boxed wargame.

X
X—eXpert series was for use with Dungeons & Dragons Expert Set except where noted and set in Mystara.

Other modules

Notes

References

External links
3.5 D&D Archives (Official Wizards of the Coast link - includes many new adventures and supplements not available in print)
Collector's Checklist (extensive online list of TSR RPG modules and gaming accessories with pictures and revision info)
The Acaeum: Module Index By Code (information and auction prices on D&D modules)
The Acaeum: Module Index By Title (information and auction prices on D&D modules)
The Acaeum: The Acaeum Library (links to essays, community support, TSR/WotC product references and TSR/WotC module downloads)